Regunathapuram may refer to:

 Regunathapuram, Papanasam, a village in Papanasam taluk, Thanjavur district, Tamil Nadu, India
 Regunathapuram, Pattukkottai, a village in Pattukkottai taluk, Thanjavur district, Tamil Nadu, India
 Regunathapuram, Pudukkottai, a village in Karambakudi taluk, Pudukkottai district, Tamil Nadu, India

See also 
 Raghunathapuram, Nalgonda district, a village in Nalgonda district, India